Güntner is a German-language surname. Notable people with this surname include:

Andreas Güntner
Michael Güntner
Jan Güntner
Bernhard Güntner
Marian Antoni Güntner

See also
Günther
Günthner

German-language surnames